The Birth of the Virgin is a 1661 painting by the Spanish artist Bartolomé Esteban Murillo.

History 
He painted it for the Chapel of the Immaculate Conception in Seville Cathedral, from which it and the same artist's Immaculate Conception were looted by French troops under marshal Jean de Dieu Soult. The French had hoped to confiscate The Vision of Saint Anthony of Padua, but the city council proposed to exchange that work for Birth and it was thus removed from the chapel. It is now in the Louvre in Paris.

Analyze 
It is one of the most important works in the artistic production of Murillo, who based himself on models of daily life in Andalusia to create the painting. Apart from the presence of angels and the halo of the Virgin, there is no other clue that shows that this is a painting with a religious theme.

The figure of the Virgin Mary is at the center of the composition, supported in the arms of various women, at the same time as a source of light emanates which illuminates the whole scene, although the group of Saint Anne remains in the shadows, incorporated in the bed. Saint Joachim also appears.

The play of light that Murillo employs recalls the works of Rembrandt, which the painter may have admired in private collections.

Sources
Nina A. Mallory El Greco to Murillo: Spanish Painting in the Golden Age, 1556–1700, Harper & Row, 1990. 
Albert Frederick Calvert, Murillo C. Scribner's sons, 1908. 

1661 paintings
Paintings by Bartolomé Esteban Murillo
Paintings in the Louvre by Spanish artists
Murillo